The 172nd Rifle Division was an infantry division of the Red Army during World War II, formed thrice.

First formation 

On 22 June 1941 it was part of the 61st Rifle Corps of the 20th Army in the Reserve of the Supreme High Command. By 10 July the division transferred to the 13th Army of the Western Front with the corps.
It was officially disbanded on 19 September.

Second formation 
It was formed on 10 October 1941 from the 3rd Crimean Motorized Division as part of the 51st Army. By 1 November it transferred to the Coastal Army. It was officially disbanded on 25 June 1942.

Third formation 
The division was reformed again on 9 September in the area of the Dorokhovo railway station, part of the Moscow Defense Zone, under the command of Lieutenant Colonel Alexander Kostitsyn. The latter transferred to command the 183rd Rifle Division on 30 September.
 
At the end of the war, it was part of the 102nd Rifle Corps of the 13th Army. 
In mid-1945 it was withdrawn to Korosten in the Carpathian Military District with the army's 27th Rifle Corps. The division was disbanded in 1946.

Commanders 
The division's first formation was commanded by the following officers:

 Major General Mikhail Romanov (14 March–19 July 1941)

The division's second formation was commanded by the following officer:

 Colonel Ivan Laskin (6 March–25 June 1942)

The division's third formation was commanded by the following officers:

 Lieutenant Colonel Alexander Kostitsyn (14–30 September 1942)
 Colonel Gavriil Sorokin (31 September 1941–22 January 1943)
 Colonel Nikolay Timofeyev (23 January 1943–1 January 1944; promoted to major general 18 May 1943)
 Colonel Nikita Korkishko (2 January–7 May 1944)
 Major General Anatoly Krasnov (8 May 1944–after 11 May 1945)

References

Sources

 
 
 
 
 
 
 
 
 
 
 

Infantry divisions of the Soviet Union in World War II
Military units and formations established in 1939
Military units and formations disestablished in 1946
Military units and formations awarded the Order of the Red Banner